Maxdale is an unincorporated community in Bell County, in the U.S. state of Texas. According to the Handbook of Texas, only 4 people lived in the community in 2000. It is located within the Killeen-Temple-Fort Hood metropolitan area.

History
The area in what is now known as Maxdale today was settled sometime before 1883. A post office was established at Maxdale that year and remained in operation until 1926. 20 people were living in Maxdale in 1884 alongside two churches and a cotton gin. A general store opened in 1914 and its population zenith was reported as 50 in 1925. There were three businesses and two churches in 1948. It declined to 15 residents by 1968. Most of its homes were abandoned, but the Maxdale Community Center was located a mile east of where the community originally stood. Only 4 people lived there from 1988 through 2000.

Geography

Education
Maxdale had its own school in 1884. Today, the community is served by the Killeen Independent School District.

References

Unincorporated communities in Texas
Unincorporated communities in Bell County, Texas